Eugenijus Karpavičius  (19 October 1953 – 26 January 2010) was a Lithuanian illustrator. He represented Lithuania at the Frankfurt Book Fair in 2002.His works are on display in the Lithuanian National Museum.

References

Lithuanian illustrators
1953 births
2010 deaths
Artists from Vilnius